Pieter Rudolph Kleijn or Kleyn (1785 – 1816) was a 19th-century landscape painter from the Northern Netherlands who died young.

Kleijn was born in Hooge Zwaluwe as one of seven children of the mayor, lawyer and poet Johannes Petrus Kleyn and the poet Antoinette Ockerse. The poet Adelaide Geertruid Kleyn was his sister. He was trained by the brothers Abraham and Jacob van Strij in Dordrecht. In 1808 he was selected for the prestigious prix-de-Rome under Lodewijk Napoleon and travelled to Paris where he studied two 1/2 years under Jacques-Louis David. He then travelled to Rome where he spent another 2 years studying but returned north in 1815 when the monarchy of the Kingdom of the Netherlands was restored. Eager to show his allegiance to the newly restored monarchy, he enlisted as a 2nd lieutenant in the Dutch army, but was wounded at the Battle of Quatre Bras. He  received the Military William Order, but never fully recovered and died of his wounds in the arms of his mother.

References

1785 births
1816 deaths
People from Drimmelen
19th-century Dutch painters
Dutch male painters
19th-century Dutch male artists